ISKCON Temple Chennai, also known as the Sri Sri Radha Krishna Mandir, is a Gaudiya Vaishnavism temple in Chennai, India. The temple is dedicated to Hindu god Radha and Krishna. It was formally inaugurated on 26 April 2012.

History

ISKCON founder A. C. Bhaktivedanta Swami Prabhupada, wanted to establish ISKCON centers in India. In 1971, when he returned to India after his success with spread of ISKCON in the Western world, he directed Giriraj Maharaj to go to Madras and preach activities, resulting in many enlisting as life patrons. Prabhupada wrote in a letter,

Prabhupada visited Madras in February 1972 and delivered lectures. In 1975, a centre was opened at 50 Aspiran Gardens, 2nd Street, Kilpauk, which was later shifted to Kilpauk Garden Road. In 1988, the centre moved to T. Nagar, where the congregation of Chennai ISKCON increased greatly. During a morning walk on 18 December 1975, Prabhupada remarked: "Now our European and American boys are preaching in South India and big, big acaryas have received them."

In January 1976, Prabhupada visited Madras again and lectured in AVM Rajeswari Kalyana Mandapam, Dr. Radhakrishnan Salai and in the house of the then Chief Justice Veeraswamy. Inspired by the positive response to Krishna consciousness in Madras, Prabhupada wrote a letter to his disciples in Madras:

However, the effort to fulfill the desire of Prabhupada to build a "gorgeous temple" in Chennai did not prove fruitful until 2000 when devotees serving under the leadership of Bhanu Swami located 6.5 acres of land in Injambakkam and acquired immediately for construction of the temple. The temple was built solely on donations received from people in Chennai. The construction of the first phase of the project began on 17 March 2002. The temple has been built with the support of about 8,000 life patrons and contributions from devotees. Built on 45,000 sq ft of land, the temple cost  100 million.

The prana pratishtha (deity installation) ceremony, when the idols of Lord Krishna and Radha and their sakhis—Lalitha and Vishaka—were installed in one of the three teak-wood altars in the main hall, and Kumbhabhishekam were performed on 26 April 2012. After the Kumbhabishekam and Maha mangala arati—the first decorated darshan of the deities—flowers were showered from a helicopter over the gopurams built in the Kalinga style with a Sudarshana Chakra on the top of the tallest tower. The idols in the temple on Burkit Road, T. Nagar unit have also been shifted to this temple.

At the time of inauguration, the temple was still under construction with a 90-ft-long construction, which was to function as the kitchen and annadhan hall, nearing completion.

Structure
ISKCON Temple Chennai is part of the Centre for Spiritual Art and Culture and is located off the East Coast Road at the Hare Krishna land, Sholinganallur. The deities worshipped in the temple include those of Radha Krishna Lalita Vishaka, Jagannath Baladev Subhadra, and Sri Sri Nitai Gauranga.

Spread over an area of over 1.5 acres, the temple is constructed on five levels. There is a 7,000 sq ft temple hall on the first floor, an auditorium for cultural and spiritual programmes on the ground floor and a prasadam hall in the basement.

In the temple hall, there are three teak-wood altars which house the deities of Lord Krishna with his chief consort Radharani and their assisting friends Lalita and Vishaka, Lord Chaitanya with Lord Nityananda and Lord Jagannath, Baladeva and Subhadra. These deities have been sourced from Jaipur and Orissa. Designed under the guidance of Sri Bhanu Swami, the temple has imbibed various attributes from Vedic scripture and is inspired by the Pallava and Kalinga architecture.

The entrance to the temple is marked by the representation of the bhu-mandala or the universe on the marble floor. According to the cosmology of ancient Vedic puranas, the universe is described as series of circular islands surrounding a central pillar called Mount Meru. The design on the floor at the entrance depicts the same universal pattern. There is also a life-like statue of a cow feeding its calf at the portico.

The primary purpose of the temple to transform the material self-centred identity into a spiritual identity of unconditional love is graphically represented by means of a magnificent chandelier that projects various colours on the walls and ceiling. The chandelier has 500 Himalayan quartz crystals supposedly meant to intensify the spiritual energy in the temple.

The temple also visually displays various vastu shastra features. A booklet explaining all these features is available at the book shop, which is located near the portico. Here you can find books and souvenirs on spirituality and Hindu philosophy. The temple is open from 7:30 am to 1:00 pm and from 4:00 pm to 8:00 pm. However, the last aarati (worship), called the sayana arati, is at 9:00 pm, which lasts about 15 minutes.

Gallery

See also

 Religion in Chennai

References

Further reading

External links

 Iskcon Chennai Website 

Radha Krishna temples
Hindu temples in Chennai
21st-century Hindu temples
International Society for Krishna Consciousness temples
2012 establishments in Tamil Nadu